Michael 'Billy' Vozzo is a former Australian rules football field umpire in the Australian Football League (AFL). He umpired 281 career games, including the 2006 AFL Grand Final and the 2008 AFL Grand Final.

References

Australian Football League umpires
Living people
Year of birth missing (living people)
Australian people of Italian descent
Place of birth missing (living people)